A clearance diver was originally a specialist naval diver who used explosives underwater to remove obstructions to make harbours and shipping channels safe to navigate, but the term "clearance diver" was later used to include other naval underwater work. Units of clearance divers were first formed during and after World War II to clear ports and harbours in the Mediterranean and Northern Europe of unexploded ordnance and shipwrecks and booby traps laid by the Germans.

In some navies, including the Royal Navy, work divers, which includes ship's divers, must have a lifeline and a line tender when reasonably practicable.

History 
The first units were Royal Navy Mine and Bomb Disposal Units. They were succeeded by the "Port Clearance Parties" (P Parties). The first operations by P Parties included clearing away the debris of unexploded ammunition left during the Normandy Invasion.  During World War II Navies used the heavy surface-supplied standard diving dress before changing to lighter self-contained rebreather equipment.

Training
Admission to clearance diver training requires the candidate to pass medical and physical fitness screening and to be a member of the relevant military force.

Scope of activity 
The scope of activity for a clearance diver varies depending on the specific armed force in which they are a member, but historically the most defining competence is skills in underwater demolition using explosives. The closely associated skills in explosive ordnance disposal are also generally implied by the designation.

Nations with clearance diving groups

Africa 
 Egypt
 South Africa

Asia

Europe 
 Denmark: Søværnets Minørtjeneste (EOD clearance diving unit) 
 Estonia: EOD Tuukrigrupp (EOD clearance diver unit)
 France: The French Navy clearance divers are known as plongeurs démineurs. The French Army also has clearance divers named plongeurs de combat du génie that operate in freshwater environments. Although they are trained in demolition and explosives clearance, they also survey river banks and possible crossing areas.
 Germany: Minentaucher is Germany's clearance diver force
 Ireland (Republic of): Naval Service Diving Section (NSDS) 
 Norway: Minedykkerkommandoen Norway's naval work divers and clearance diver force.
 Portugal: the Sappers Divers Group, which also serve as combat divers unit.
 Sweden: Röjdykare, Swedish Navy EOD division

United Kingdom 

Royal Navy naval work divers are officially called Clearance Divers.  During WWII divers used the Davis Submerged Escape Apparatus (DSEA), no wetsuit or swimfins.  On 17 December 1942, six Italian divers on three manned torpedoes attacked Gibraltar harbour. A British patrol boat killed the crew of one with a depth charge. Their bodies were recovered and their swimfins later used by Gibraltar's guard divers (Sydney Knowles and Commander Lionel Crabb). This was the first known British use of swimfins.

In November 1944, following  surrender of Italian forces an Italian frogman brought two Decima Flottiglia issue oxygen rebreathers and a 2-piece frogman's drysuit to Livorno, for the Allies to use. This equipment proved better than the Davis Apparatus and lasted longer on a dive.  After the war and until the 1990s divers used the Siebe Gorman rebreather and aqualung.

Training to become a Clearance Diver takes around 7 months.  Before trainees are accepted onto a course, they must pass a week-long diving aptitude selection, held at the Defence Diving School, on Horsea Island, Portsmouth. This selection involves passing the Divers Physical Fitness Test (DPFT), tests of physical and mental endurance and surface swimming. The candidates are also introduced to the Royal Navy's Swimmers Air Breathing Apparatus and dive in Horsea lake, including night dives. Historically, the failure rate has been high due to the physical and psychological pressures of military diving, so there is a three-day Pre Entry Diving Acquaint (PEDA), which allows prospective candidates to undergo physical and mental tests to give them a better idea of what to expect of the training.

The diving branch is formed of teams, that serve aboard mine hunters, perform domestic bomb, mine and IED disposal and the two Fleet Diving Groups (FDG).
 Expeditionary Diving Group (EDG) comes under 3 Commando Brigade specialising in Very Shallow Water (VSW) beach reconnaissance operations, working alongside UK Special Forces (UKSF). New members are trained in parachuting, maritime counter-terrorism (MCT) tactics and swimmer delivery vehicle (SDV) operations. 
 Tactical Diving Group (TDG) is the deep-water warfare unit who specialise in sea mine disposal. Members cross-train with EDG. 
Clearance divers have been involved in every major British conflict since their inception and have most recently deployed teams to Iraq, Afghanistan and Libya. They have units operating in the Persian Gulf and Indian Ocean providing an underwater force protection (UWFP) element.  See Operation Kipion.

From 2022 Royal Navy Divers will come under the Diving & Threat Exploitation Group (DTXG) based in Portsmouth, Plymouth and Faslane. It comprises:

 A Squadron (formerly Tactical Diving Group) Special operations squadron - Horsea Island, Portsmouth.
 B Squadron (formerly Southern Diving Group) Homeland Defence and IWMAR diving to SURFLOT, geographically distributed between Horsea Island, Portsmouth and HMNB Devonport
 C Squadron (formerly Northern Diving Group) Homeland Defence and IWMAR diving to SUBFLOT, located in HMNB Clyde.
 D Squadron (formerly Expeditionary Diving Group) MTG, LRG / JEF(M) facing, located at Horsea Island, Portsmouth.
 E Squadron (Explosive exploitation) Horsea Island, Portsmouth, with options to disperse force elements to HMNB Clyde and Devonport.

North America 
 Canada: Canadian armed forces divers
 US: 
 Underwater Demolition Team - US Navy, 1943–1967
 Navy EOD, 1941–Present. In 1941 Draper Kauffman established the U.S. Naval Mine School at Naval Gun Factory in Washington, D.C., and subsequently the Bomb Disposal School was established. In 1943 Kauffman selected men from the EOD school to create the Naval Combat Demolition Units (NCDU) teams that would take part in the landing at Normandy. The first U.S. casualty in mine disposal was in 1942, when Ensign John M. Howard was killed when he attempted to dismantle a booby-trapped German magnetic submarine-laid moored mine. About 20 trained bomb and mine disposal personnel, were killed in action during WWII. 
 US Navy Underwater Construction Teams, 1960’s - Present

Oceania 
 Australia: The Royal Australian Navy Clearance Diving Branch divers serve as combat divers on tactical operations using oxygen rebreathers, mine counter-measures, and underwater battle damage repair. Work may include underwater searches and salvage, and neutralising explosive devices. Clearance diver qualification is recognised for civilian equivalences with accreditation through the Australian Diver Accreditation Scheme (ADAS) .
 New Zealand: The Royal New Zealand Navy Operational Diving Team (ODT) are clearance divers and also serve as combat divers

See also

References 

Armed forces diving
Royal Navy specialisms